Another Rosie Christmas is the second studio album by American comedian Rosie O'Donnell. The album was released by Columbia Records on October 31, 2000.

Critical reception

In a retrospective review for AllMusic, William Ruhlmann said: "Leaving aside the unwanted intrusions on the album by its top-billed performer, the record's stylistic range is so broad there's bound to be some track for any listener to like, as well as a couple to dislike."

Chart performance
Another Rosie Christmas peaked at number 45 on the US Billboard 200 and number three on the US Top Holiday Albums.

Track listing

Charts

Year-end charts

Certifications

References

2000 Christmas albums
 Christmas albums by American artists
 Columbia Records Christmas albums